Baljit Singh (born February 23, 1977 in Frederiksberg) is a Danish cricketer who has played for Denmark in the Cheltenham and Gloucester Trophy and ICC Trophy.

External links
 Cricket Archive

1977 births
Living people
Danish cricketers
Wicket-keepers
Sportspeople from Frederiksberg